Pedro Simão (born 16 August 1915, date of death unknown) is a Brazilian former sports shooter. He competed at the 1948 Summer Olympics, 1952 Summer Olympics and 1956 Summer Olympics.

References

External links
  

1915 births
Year of death missing
Brazilian male sport shooters
Olympic shooters of Brazil
Shooters at the 1948 Summer Olympics
Shooters at the 1952 Summer Olympics
Shooters at the 1956 Summer Olympics
Pan American Games medalists in shooting
Pan American Games silver medalists for Brazil
Shooters at the 1951 Pan American Games
Medalists at the 1951 Pan American Games
20th-century Brazilian people